Umlauf is an Austrian family name, found also in Moravia.

Notable people with the surname include:
Ignaz Umlauf (1746-1796), Austrian composer, Kapellmeister of the emperor's German-language Singspiel theatre in Vienna
Michael Umlauf (1781–1842), an Austrian composer, conductor (notably of Beethoven's 9th Symphony), and violinist, son of Ignaz Umlauf. 
Charles Umlauf (1911–1994), an American sculptor
Umlauf Sculpture Garden and Museum
Klaas Heufer-Umlauf (1983) a German television host
K.A. Umlauf, student of Engel, who gave a complete proof of Engel's theorem in his 1891 dissertation

References

German-language surnames